Judy Reyes (born November 5, 1967) is an American actress, model and producer, best known for her roles as Carla Espinosa on the NBC/ABC medical comedy series Scrubs (2001–2009), and as Zoila Diaz in the Lifetime comedy-drama Devious Maids (2013–2016). Beginning in 2017, she stars as Annalise "Quiet Ann" Zayas in the TNT crime comedy-drama Claws.

Early life
Reyes was born in The Bronx, New York, to Dominican immigrants, and has three sisters, including a fraternal twin sister named Joselin Reyes, who played a paramedic on Law & Order: Special Victims Unit. Reyes grew up on Bainbridge Avenue, from the age of 13 to the age of 25–26. She attended Hunter College in Manhattan, where she began her acting career.

Career
In the early 1990s, Reyes began her television career with guest starring roles in a number of shows, including Law & Order, NYPD Blue, and The Sopranos. She also had a recurring role in Oz as Tina Rivera. She is best known for her portrayal of nurse Carla Espinosa on the NBC comedy Scrubs from 2001 to 2009. She has starred in a number of made for television movies, primarily for Lifetime network, including Little Girl Lost: The Delimar Vera Story (2008), and The Pregnancy Project (2012).

After leaving Scrubs, Reyes guest-starred in several shows, including Castle, Medium, Off the Map, and Law & Order: Special Victims Unit. In 2011, she starred as a mother dealing with her estranged husband's return into her life after his stint in prison in the independent drama Gun Hill Road. The film is set in Reyes' native Bronx, and its title refers to a real-life street that intersects Bainbridge Avenue on which Reyes herself grew up. The film premiered at the Sundance Film Festival. Reyes also had small supporting roles in several films, including Went to Coney Island on a Mission from God... Be Back by Five (1998), Bringing Out the Dead (1999), Washington Heights (2002), and Dirty (2005).

In 2012, Reyes was cast as series regular Zoila Diaz, the senior maid, in the ABC comedy-drama pilot Devious Maids, created by Marc Cherry. On May 14, 2012, the series was not picked up by ABC, but on June 22, 2012, Lifetime ordered a run of thirteen episodes. The series premiered June 23, 2013. The Devious Maids finale episode aired on August 8, 2016. Two weeks following the show's cancellation, Reyes was cast opposite Niecy Nash in the TNT crime comedy-drama Claws. The series premiered on June 11, 2017.

In Succession, which premiered on June 3, 2018 on HBO, Reyes plays Eva, executive producer of media conglomerate Waystar Royco's ATN news channel.

In 2022, Reyes guest-starred in season 3 of Batwoman where she portrayed Kiki Roulette who was responsible for building Joker's joy buzzer.

Personal life

Reyes was married to writer/director Edwin M. Figueroa for 11 years before they divorced. Reyes and her partner George Valencia have a daughter, Leila Rey Valencia, born on November 27, 2009.

Filmography

Film

Television

References

External links

 

1967 births
20th-century American actresses
21st-century American actresses
Actresses from New York City
American film actresses
American television actresses
American people of Dominican Republic descent
Hispanic and Latino American actresses
Hunter College alumni
Living people
People from the Bronx
American twins